Hu Ke (born 1 December 1975) is a Chinese host and actress best known for her role as Niu Suyun on Moment in Peking and has also starred in a number of films, including Chat, The Empire Symbol, and Goddesses in the Flames of War.

Early life and education
Hu was born in Jiaxing, Zhejiang on December 1, 1975. In 1998 she graduated from Beijing Broadcasting Institute (now Communication University of China), where she majored in broadcasting and hosting. After college, she worked at Phoenix Satellite Television in Hong Kong for half a year. In 1998 she joined The Walt Disney Company, becoming a host in The Dragon Club. From 2002 to 2005 she was a host of Happy Mobilization. After hosting several TV programs, Hu entered the entertainment circle.

Acting career
Hu made her television debut in the historical drama Storm of the Dragon (2000). Hu's first major television role was as Li Cuilian in Legendary Li Cuilian 2 (2001).

In 2002 she made her film debut in Chat, which earned her a Best Actress at the 9th Beijing College Student Film Festival. That same year, she landed a guest starring role on Affair of Half a Lifetime playing role of Shi Cuizhi.

Hu co-starred with Jimmy Lin and Calvin Li as Chu Chu in the wuxia television series The Tale of the Romantic Swordsman (2003). She was cast as Jin'er in the shenmo television series The Eighteen Arhats.

Hu played a key supporting role in Moment in Peking (2005) directed by Zhang Zi'en and based on the novel of the same name. She also played one of the lead roles in the shenmo television series Strange Tales of Liao Zhai opposite Huang Xiaoming. Hu co-starred with Nicholas Tse in the martial arts television series Wing Chun.

In 2007, Hu starred opposite Nie Yuan in Red Streamer, the series was one of the most watched ones in mainland China in that year. She played one of the lead characters in the fantasy drama Fairy Couple.

In 2008, she played the role of Su Quan in Royal Tramp, a television adaptation of Jin Yong' wuxia novel The Deer and the Cauldron.

Hu participated  as Gu Dasao in All Men Are Brothers (2011), adapted from Ming dynasty novelist Shi Nai'an's classical novel Water Margin.  That same year, she portrayed Princess Iron Fan in Journey to the West, based on the novel by the same name by Ming dynasty novelist Wu Cheng'en.

In 2012, Hu made her stage debut in Desire Garden.

In 2013, Hu took part in the stage play The Blind Message, based on the award-winningfilm of the same name.
Hu also co-starred with Pan Yueming in the action film The Empire Symbol.

In September 2016, she joined the cast of Ruyi's Royal Love in the Palace as Imperial Noble Consort Chunhui.

Hu was part of the ensemble cast which featured in the war film Goddesses in the Flames of War (2017).

In June 2018, she played a supporting role in Legend of Fuyao, a fantasy adventure television series based on the novel Empress Fuyao. The same year, she also starred in the historical drama The Rise of Phoenixes.

Personal life
In 2009 Hu first met actor Sha Yi at Hu Ke Xing Ganjue, in which he was a guest. They held their wedding ceremony in Beijing on February 20, 2011. They have two sons, Sha Junbo, born on 16 July 2011, and Sha Junliang, born on 19 August 2014.

Filmography

Film

Television series

Drama

Awards and nominations

References

External links
 
 Hu Ke on Chinesemov

1975 births
Living people
Communication University of China alumni
21st-century Chinese actresses
Actresses from Jiaxing
Chinese film actresses
Chinese television actresses
Chinese television presenters
Chinese women television presenters